Bernard Riley (born January 12, 1981) is a former American football defensive lineman.  He is currently the defensive coordinator at Austin High School in Austin, Texas.

High school career
Riley prepped and was a high school All-American at Los Alamitos High School, playing under Coach John Barnes and alongside Keenan Howry and Chris Kluwe. Riley started as a defensive lineman.

He played alongside former Philadelphia Eagles defensive tackle and 2005 first round pick Mike Patterson, who was also his future teammate at USC.

College career
Riley played college football at the University of Southern California.

Professional career
Bernard signed with the Tampa Bay Buccaneers of the NFL as an undrafted free agent out of college.

Riley played in the Arena Football League for the Los Angeles Avengers, the Columbus Destroyers and is currently retired from football.

References

External links
UT Martin Skyhawks bio
USC Trojans bio

1981 births
Living people
Players of American football from San Jose, California
American football defensive linemen
USC Trojans football players
Los Angeles Avengers players
Columbus Destroyers players
Arizona Rattlers players
UT Martin Skyhawks football coaches